Rajith Priyan (born 25 August 1988) is a Sri Lankan cricketer. He made his first-class debut for Galle Cricket Club in the 2012–13 Premier Trophy on 1 February 2013.

References

External links
 

1988 births
Living people
Sri Lankan cricketers
Galle Cricket Club cricketers
Nondescripts Cricket Club cricketers
Place of birth missing (living people)